Marie Muller (born 29 July 1985, in Filderstadt) is a Luxembourger judoka.

Biography
Marie Muller's first official competition was the EM U23 tournament in Ljubljana 2004, where she finished in third place. Since that competition Marie has participated in about 20 tournaments including the Beijing Olympic Games and the London Olympic Games in 2012. Her best achievement besides participating in the Olympics was first place in the Swedish open in 2007 and first place in the 2008 A-World Cup (Birmingham). Muller has also earned the title of best Luxembourgish athlete of the year three times in 2008, 2010 and 2012.

Main results
2012 - Summer Olympics London (-52 kg) - 5th place

2008 – A-World Cup in Birmingham
2008 – Summer Olympics Beijing (−52 kg) – 9th place
2008 – 2008 World cup in Moscow – 5th place
2007 – Monaco games – 1st place
2007 – Sweden Open – 1st place
2006 – DHM Braunschweig – 1st place

2008 Summer Olympics – Beijing 
At the 2008 Summer Olympics, Muller's first bout was against one of the eventual bronze medal winners, Soraya Haddad of Algeria in which she lost 0001–0211. She did, however, advance to the repechage rounds. Her first repechage bout was against Hortance Diedhiou of Senegal and she won 1001–0001. In her second repechage bout, she lost to Kim Kyung-Ok of South Korea. She didn't advance to the later repechage rounds.

2012 Summer Olympics – London 
At the 2012 Summer Olympics, Muller first beat Ana Carrascosa of Spain and then beat María García of the Dominican Republic. In the quarter finals however, she lost to silver medalists, Yanet Bermoy from Cuba but qualified for the repechage rounds. In the repechage rounds, she first beat Mauritius' Christianne Legentil and moved on to the bronze medal bout against Italy's Rosalba Forciniti. The bout finished with Forciniti crowned the joint bronze medalist along with Priscilla Gneto from France.

References

External links
 Marie Muller – Official page
 
 
 
 
 

1985 births
Living people
Luxembourgian female judoka
Judoka at the 2008 Summer Olympics
Judoka at the 2012 Summer Olympics
Olympic judoka of Luxembourg
European Games competitors for Luxembourg
Judoka at the 2015 European Games